María Carrillo Moreno (14 October 1919 - 31 July 2009) better known as Mary Carrillo was a Spanish actress. She appeared in more than fifty films from 1937 to 2002.

Selected filmography

References

External links 

1919 births
2009 deaths
Spanish film actresses
20th-century Spanish actresses